Michel Falempin (born 1945, Paris) is a French writer.

His work, written outside the literary genres, is influenced in particular by Stéphane Mallarmé, the literatures of the baroque age and the avant-gardes of which Michel Falempin comes from.

Works 
1976: L'Écrit fait masse, Paris, Flammarion, coll. Digraphe, (Prix Fénéon)
1987 La Légende travestie, Flammarion, series "Textes"
1989: L’ Œil occulte, Paris, Imprimerie nationale, series "Littérature"
1989: Stances de l'Érinnye, Nœux-les-Mines, Ecbolade
1991: Le Paradoxe du lotus, La souterraine, la Main Courante
1994: Gongora parmi les ombres, Barcelona, bilingual edition, Noésis, coll. Parvula
1995: L'Apparence de la vie, Paris, éditions Ivrea, 
1996: La Prescription, éditions Ivrea, 
1997: Ce que fiction veut dire, Lyon, Horlieu(x)
1999: Fiction lente, éditions Ivrea, 
2003: La tierce personne, Paris, L'Harmattan, series "Levée d'ancre"
2008: Exeat, Nœux-les-Mines, Ecbolade
2008: Faux airs, Publie.net (livre numérique)
2011: La vie littéraire, L'Harmattan, series "Levée d'ancre"
2012: L'irréel du passé, Hazebrouck, Hapax

External links 
 Le Matricule des Anges recense Fiction lente
 Michel Falempin sur le site du Centre international de poésie
 Un article d’Alain Frontier sur L’irréel du passé Sitaudis (site internet), 2013

Prix Fénéon winners
20th-century French poets
21st-century French poets
21st-century French male writers
Writers from Paris
1945 births
Living people
20th-century French male writers